The Kurgan Oblast Duma is the regional parliament of Kurgan Oblast, a federal subject of Russia. It was created in 1994 and consists of 34 deputies.

Elections

2015

2020

Chairmen

References

Sources
The official website of Kurgan Oblast Duma. History

External links
Official website of the Kurgan Oblast Duma 

Politics of Kurgan Oblast
Kurgan
Unicameral legislatures